WACO-FM (99.9 MHz, "WACO 100") is a commercial FM radio station in Waco, Texas. It airs a country music radio format and is owned by iHeartMedia, Inc.  The studios and offices are located on West Highway 6 in Southwest Waco.  The transmitter is off Tower Drive in McLennan County in the community of Moody, amid towers for other local FM and TV stations.

WACO-FM has an effective radiated power (ERP) of 90,000 watts, broadcasting from a tower  in height above average terrain (HAAT). The station brands itself as "WACO 100, a station so big they named the entire city after it." The station can be heard from Dallas/Ft. Worth to Austin.

Programming
Weekdays begin with the "Zack & Jim Show" hosted by Zack Owen & Jim Cody. The rest of the daytime and evening schedule is made up of local DJs. Overnight, WACO-FM carries the syndicated CMT After Midnight with Cody Alan.  During the lunch hour, country classics are heard.

Notable weekend programming includes "The Best of Zack and Jim" highlight show on Saturday mornings and Bob Kingsley's "Country Top 40" on weekends.

History

Early years
In June 1960, WACO-FM signed on for the first time.  It was the FM counterpart to AM 1460 WACO, which had been owned by the Waco Broadcasting Company since its founding in 1922. WACO-AM-FM simulcast a country music format and were ABC Radio News Network affiliates. WACO-FM was powered at 3,900 watts, a fraction of its current output.

In the late 1960s, WACO-FM switched to an automated easy listening format while the AM station continued to play country music. In the late 1970s, the FM station switched to Top 40 with the call sign KHOO. In 1982, WACO and KHOO were acquired by Sage Broadcasting. Sage moved FM 99.9 to adult contemporary music under the branding "FM-100". In 1987, the station returned back to its original call letters, WACO-FM, retaining its AC format. For a short period of time in 1989, the station switched its call letters to KTKS-FM.

Switch to country
In 1990, 99.9 flipped back to its original call letters, WACO-FM, dropped its AC format, and switched back to country music.  In 1996, the AM station switched to all-sports as KKTK, while the country music continued on 99.9 WACO-FM.

WACO-FM was bought by Capstar Broadcasting, which was later acquired by Clear Channel Communications, a forerunner of current owner iHeartMedia.

Unusual call letters
WACO-FM is one of three stations in the United States where the call letters spell out the name of the city of license. The other stations are AM 1250 WARE in Ware, Massachusetts, and 90.5 WISE-FM in Wise, Virginia, a satellite of NPR network affiliate WVTF. In addition, WACO-FM is also one of a small number of call signs whose beginning letter deviates from FCC standards of W in the East and K in the West.

Originally the WACO call letters were on an AM radio station that went on the air in Waco in 1922 as WJAD, but later changed to WACO.  In the early days of broadcasting, radio stations in Texas were given call signs beginning with W. The border between Texas and New Mexico had been part of the dividing line between W and K. By 1923, the border had been moved to the Mississippi River, putting Texas in K territory. But stations already on the air, such as WOAI San Antonio and WBAP Fort Worth, were allowed to keep their W call signs. In 1960, when AM 1460 WACO added an FM counterpart, that station was able to share its unique call letters, with an -FM suffix. In 1996, WACO (AM) changed its call letters to KKTK and later moved into the Dallas-Fort Worth Metroplex radio market as KCLE. WACO-FM was allowed to keep its call sign, which it operates under to this day.

References

External links
WACO-FM official website

µWACO-FM
Country radio stations in the United States
Radio stations established in 1965
1965 establishments in Texas
IHeartMedia radio stations